Baiyun Culture Square Station, formerly called Xinshi Station and later Convention Centre Station during planning, is a metro station on Line 2 of the Guangzhou Metro. It is located underground at the west end of Baiyun International Convention Centre, the east of Yuncheng Road West and the south of Qifu Road, in the Baiyun District in Guangzhou. It started operation on 25September 2010.

Notes

References

Railway stations in China opened in 2010
Guangzhou Metro stations in Baiyun District